Derrick Pierce (born March 1, 1974) is an American pornographic actor, director, radio personality, and personal trainer. Pierce has received several adult industry awards, including the 2009 NightMoves Award for Best Male Performer and the 2016 XRCO Award for Best Actor.

Early life
Pierce was born in Springfield, Massachusetts and raised in Los Angeles, California. He is of French and Italian descent. He was raised by a single mother whom he credits as a strong influence in his life. His mother was also in the entertainment world, as were her girlfriends.

As a child, he moved to Southern California with his mother and grew up in the Sylmar area of the San Fernando Valley.

Pierce began his career in pornographic adult films in approximately 2005. Previously, he was a certified personal trainer and martial arts instructor for sixteen years before working in porn.

Career in adult films
Pierce's first scene was with Vanessa Lane in Gothsend 4. He chose the last name "Pierce" for his stage name because he had nipple and tongue piercings at the time. The first name "Derrick" was suggested by an ex-girlfriend of his.

Work in other media
In May 2008, Derrick Pierce became the co-host, with Kylie Ireland, of Playboy's Sirius Radio show, "The Friday Night Threeway".

Awards and nominations

References

External links

 
 
 "Derrick Pierce Interview" August 2008 by Honest West via email for XXXpwnage.com Adult Web Reviews
 "Kylie Ireland, Derrick Pierce Host New Playboy Radio Show" June 13, 2008 by Steve Javors for XBIZ.com
 Online Archive - MP3 Segments of Playboy Radio Friday Night Threeway Shows (Kylie Ireland, Derrick Pierce, and weekly porn actress
   "Derrick Pierce - Young Gun" 2006, MP3 Podcast interview by AdultDVDTalk.com
 "Derrick Pierce Interview" September, 2008, Podcast by Georgia and Diamond for AdultMaven.com
 Review of Chemistry 3: "The Experiment Continues"

1974 births
Actors from Springfield, Massachusetts
American male pornographic film actors
American people of French descent
American people of Italian descent
Living people
Male actors from Los Angeles
Pornographic film actors from California
Pornographic film actors from Massachusetts
Radio personalities from Massachusetts